The 2005 European Cup was the 26th edition of the European Cup of athletics.

The Super League Finals were held in Florence, Italy from 17 to 19 June, like two years before the 2003 European Cup.

Super League

Team standings

Top six teams qualified for the 2006 European Indoor Cup.

Results summary

Men's events

Women's events

First League
The First League was held on 18 and 19 June

Men

Group A
Held in Gävle, Sweden

Group B
Held in Leiria, Portugal

Women

Group A
Held in Gävle, Sweden

Group B
Held in Leiria, Portugal

The winner of each group also qualified for the 2006 European Indoor Cup.

Second League
The Second League was held on 18 and 19 June

Men

Group A
Held in Tallinn, Estonia

Group B
Held in Istanbul, Turkey

Women

Group A
Held in Tallinn, Estonia

Group B
Held in Istanbul, Turkey

References

External links
European Cup results (Men) from GBR Athletics
European Cup results (Women) from GBR Athletics

European Cup (athletics)
European Cup
2005 in Italian sport
International athletics competitions hosted by Italy